The Calgary Junior Hockey League is a Junior "B" ice hockey league based in Calgary, Alberta, Canada. It is sanctioned by Hockey Canada, and operated by Hockey Calgary. Founded in 1945, the CJHL is one of the oldest hockey leagues operating in Alberta.

The league champion earns a berth in the Alberta Provincial Junior B Hockey Championship, with a chance to participate in the Western Canadian championship, the Keystone Cup.

Teams

League Organization 
The modern CJHL is governed by the by-laws of Hockey Calgary which stipulates that each of Calgary's four community hockey associations operate at least one team. Presently, each association operates two teams that play a 30-game season.

In the past, teams from outside the Calgary area have also participated in the league. Both the Okotoks Oilers and the High River Flyers of the Heritage Junior B Hockey League were originally members of the CJHL.

2006 incident
The CJHL gained national attention in October 2006 following a violent brawl which occurred in the hallway of a Calgary arena following a game between the NWCAA Bruins and the NEAA Canucks. A linesman attempting to break up an off-ice scuffle was allegedly knocked unconscious by a kick to the head in the melee which involved players, coaches and fans/parents.

As a result of a police investigation, Robert Simard, 21, of Calgary was charged with one count of assault for allegedly kicking linesman Rory McCuaig in the head. Simard and one other player involved in the brawl were given two-year suspensions from playing in the league, ending their junior careers, and carrying over to any league sanctioned by Hockey Alberta. One parent was given a ban from all Hockey Calgary sanctioned arenas.

Champions

-Alberta provincial champions listed in bold

1 Also won Keystone Cup Western Canadian Junior B Champion. Team members of the 1987 NWCAA Bruins included Ken MacLean, Chris Tibbles, Terry Copot (Coach), Neil Houghton, Brendan Black, Craig Wheeler, Steve Jordan, Craig Coulombe, Scott Muzychka, Ross Rayment, Barry Faminoff, Dan Matley, Jeff Hegland, Brad Thompson (Asst. Coach), Otto Gentile, Doug Thubron, John Irvine, Sandy Quilty, Blaine Louis, Brent Willis and Scott Burrell.

See also
 List of ice hockey teams in Alberta
 Ice hockey in Calgary

References

External links
Calgary Junior Hockey League
Calgary Buffalo Hockey Association (CBHA)
Calgary Northstars Hockey Association (CNHA)
Calgary Royals Athletic Association (CRAA)
North West Calgary Athletic Association (NWCAA)

1945 establishments in Alberta
Ice hockey in Calgary
Ice hockey leagues in Alberta
Sports leagues established in 1945
B